GOES-4, known as GOES-D before becoming operational, was a geostationary weather satellite which was operated by the United States National Oceanic and Atmospheric Administration as part of the Geostationary Operational Environmental Satellite system. Launched in 1980, it was used for weather forecasting in the United States, and later in Europe. Following its retirement it became the first satellite to be sent into a graveyard orbit.

Limited lifespan

GOES-4 was built by Hughes Space and Communications, and was based around the HS-371 satellite bus. It was the first HS-371 based GOES satellite.

Launch and orbit
GOES-D was launched using a Delta 3914 carrier rocket flying from Launch Complex 17A at the Cape Canaveral Air Force Station. The launch occurred at 22:27 GMT on 9 September 1980. The launch successfully placed GOES-D into a geosynchronous transfer orbit, from which it raised itself to geostationary orbit by means of an onboard  Star-27 apogee motor. Its insertion into geostationary orbit occurred at 12:00 on 11 September.

Following its insertion into geostationary orbit, GOES-4 was positioned at 98° West. In 1981, it was moved to 135° West, where it remained until 1983 when it was moved to 139° West (1983–1984). In 1985 it was repositioned at 10° West, and later 44° West, where it provided coverage of Europe for EUMETSAT following the failure of the Meteosat-2 spacecraft.

Graveyard orbit
Following the end of its operations over Europe, GOES-4 was retired from service. It became the first spacecraft to be raised out of geosynchronous orbit, into a graveyard orbit for disposal. This was accomplished on 9 November 1988, using remaining propellent in the satellite's station-keeping thrusters.

See also

1980 in spaceflight

References

Spacecraft launched in 1980
Geostationary Operational Environmental Satellites